The poll tax riots were a series of riots in British towns and cities during protests against the Community Charge (commonly known as the "poll tax"), introduced by the Conservative government of Prime Minister Margaret Thatcher. The largest protest occurred in central London on Saturday 31 March 1990, shortly before the tax was due to come into force in England and Wales.

Background
The advent of the poll tax was due to an effort to alter the way the tax system was used to fund local government in the UK. The system in place until this time was called "rates" and had been in place in some form from the beginning of the 17th century. The rates system has been described as "a levy on property, which in modern times saw each taxpayer paying a rate based on the estimated rental value of their home".

The Thatcher government had long promised to replace domestic rates, which were unpopular, especially among Conservative voters. They were seen by many as an unfair way of raising revenue for local councils.  It was levied on houses rather than people.

The proposed replacement was a flat-rate per capita Community Charge—"a head tax that saw every adult pay a fixed rate amount set by their local authority". The new Charge was widely called a "poll tax" and was introduced in Scotland in 1989 and in England and Wales a year later. The Charge proved extremely unpopular; while students and the registered unemployed had to pay 20%, some large families occupying relatively small houses saw their charges go up considerably, and the tax was thus accused of saving the rich money and moving the expenses onto the poor.

In November 1989 the All Britain Anti-Poll Tax Federation was set up by the Militant tendency. Other groups such as the 3D network provided national coordination for anti-poll tax unions who were not aligned to particular political factions. After the leadership of the Labour Party refused to back any demonstration against the poll tax, the All Britain Federation called a demonstration in London for 31 March 1990, the day before the tax was due to be launched. 

During the early months of 1990, over 6,000 anti-poll tax actions were held nationwide, with demonstrations in cities around England and Wales drawing together thousands of protestors, in a wave of protests which attracted notably large numbers in the South West. On 6 March, a 5,000-strong demonstration in Bristol escalated into clashes, leading to mounted police charging the crowd and arresting 26 demonstrators, with injuries being sustained by both sides. The following day, police baton charged demonstrators in Hackney, escalating the demonstration into a riot, during which 50 high street shop windows were smashed and 56 rioters were arrested. Demonstrations were routinely called in places where councils discussed the poll tax, some resolving peacefully and others escalating into riots, with numerous cases of protestors storming council chambers and forcing meetings to be called off - although none prevented the tax from being implemented. Both Prime Minister Margaret Thatcher and opposition leader Neil Kinnock responded by blaming the demonstrations on outside agitators, respectively calling them "rent a mob extremists" and "Toy Town revolutionaries".

As coaches bound for London were booked all around the country, it soon became clear that the planned demonstration was going to be larger than the 20,000 expected by Militant, who were more focused on the non-payment campaign than political demonstrations. When campaigners met with Metropolitan Police and gave them an expected number of 30,000, the chief police officer responded with laughter, as their own intelligence indicated far fewer numbers. In acknowledgement of the square's capacity, the organisers asked to divert the march to Hyde Park but were denied.

Protest in Trafalgar Square

On 31 March 1990, people began gathering in Kennington Park from noon. Between 180,000 and 250,000 arrived.  The police report, a year after the riot, estimated the crowd at 200,000. An abandoned rally by the Labour Party may have contributed to the number of protesters. The march began at Kennington Park at 1:30pm, moving faster than planned because some of the crowd had forced open the gates of the park, presumably in order to avoid being forced through smaller gates. This split the march over both sides of the road, and protesters continued in much the same way for the rest of the route.

By 2:30pm, Trafalgar Square was nearing its capacity. Unable to continue moving easily into Trafalgar Square, at about 3pm the march stopped in Whitehall. The police, worried about a surge towards the new security gates of Downing Street, blocked the top and bottom of Whitehall, and lined the pavement refusing to let people leave the road. Additional police units were dispatched to reinforce the officers manning the barrier blocking the Downing Street side of Whitehall. The section of the march which stopped opposite Downing Street reportedly contained veteran anarchists and a group called "Bikers Against The Poll Tax", some of whom became aggravated by reportedly heavy-handed arrests, including one of a man in a wheelchair.

Mounted riot police were brought in behind this immobilised section of the march, in theory to clear the protesters from Whitehall, despite both retreat and advance being blocked by further lines of police. Meanwhile, the tail-end had been diverted at the Parliament Square end of Whitehall, and the anarchists it had attracted were at the head of an unpoliced portion of the march. These people walked to Richmond Terrace, bringing the diverted march into Whitehall, opposite Downing Street and behind the police lines on that side of Whitehall. The protesters at the rear of the stationary group, being faced by mounted police seemingly preparing to charge, sat down on the road for safety. Despite black-clothed and scarf-masked people running through seemingly from behind the police lines and urging them up, they remained seated until physically dragged away and arrested for "obstructing Whitehall". The mounted police then advanced at speed, forcing the Whitehall section of the march to fight its way into Trafalgar Square.

From 4pm, with the rally nearly officially over, contradictory reports began to arise.  According to some sources, mounted riot police (officially used in an attempt to clear Whitehall of protesters) charged out of a side street into the crowd in Trafalgar Square.  Whether intentional or not, this was interpreted by the crowd as a provocation, fueling anger in the Square where the police had already been pushing sections of crowd back into corners, leaving no way out except through the police. At 4:30pm, four shielded police riot vans drove into the crowd (a tactic in dealing with mass demonstrations at the time) outside the South African Embassy, attempting to force through to the entrance to Whitehall where police were re-grouping. The crowd attacked the vans with wooden staves and scaffolding poles. Soon after, rioting began to escalate.

By 4:30pm, police had closed the main Underground stations in the area and southern exits of Trafalgar Square, making it difficult for people to disperse. Coaches had been parked south of the river, so many marchers tried to move south. At this point, Militant Fed stewards were withdrawn on police orders. Sections of the crowd, including unemployed coal miners, climbed scaffolding and rained debris on the police below. At 5pm, builders' cabins below the scaffolding caught fire, followed by a room in the South African Embassy on the other side of the Square. The smoke from the fires caused near darkness in the Square and produced a 20-minute lull in rioting.

Between 6 and 7pm, the police opened the southern exits of the Square and slowly moved people out of Trafalgar Square. A large section of the crowd was moved back down Northumberland Avenue and allowed over the River Thames in order to return to their organised transport. Two other sections of demonstrators, now very angry and aggravated, were pushed north into the wealthy shopping streets of West End, which suffered reported theft and vandalism. Published accounts detail shop windows being broken, goods looted, and cars being overturned in Piccadilly Circus, Oxford Street, Regent Street, Charing Cross Road, and Covent Garden. Police ordered pubs to close.

The demonstrators mixed in with the general public. By midnight, released figures claimed 113 were injured, mostly members of the public, but also police officers, and 339 people had been arrested. Scuffles between rioters and police continued until 3am. Rioters attacked numerous shops, most notably Stringfellow's nightclub, and car showrooms, and Covent Garden cafés and wine bars were set ablaze, along with motor vehicles.

Responses
The response of the Metropolitan Police, the Government, the Labour Party and the labour movement and some of the Marxist and Trotskyist left, notably the Militant tendency, was to condemn the riot as senseless and to blame anarchists. Tommy Sheridan of Scottish Militant Labour condemned the protesters. The next day, Steve Nally, also a Socialist Party member and Secretary of the All Britain Anti-Poll Tax Federation, said that they would "hold an enquiry and name names". Many others denounced the All Britain Anti-Poll Tax Federation position and defended those who fought back against the police attacks. Danny Burns (secretary of the Avon Federation of anti-Poll Tax Unions) for example said: "Often attack is the only effective form of defence and, as a movement, we should not be ashamed or defensive about these actions; we should be proud of those who did fight back."

The Socialist Workers' Party (SWP), which was blamed for the violence by some in the media and by Labour MP George Galloway, refused to condemn protesters, calling the events a "police riot". Pat Stack, then a member of the SWP's Central Committee, told The Times: "We did not go on the demonstration with any intention of fighting with the police, but we understand why people are angry and we will not condemn that anger."

A 1991 police report concluded there was "no evidence that the trouble was orchestrated by left-wing anarchist groups". Afterwards, the non-aligned Trafalgar Square Defendants Campaign was set up, committed to unconditional support for the defendants, and to accountability to the defendants. The Campaign acquired more than 50 hours of police videos. Use of these was influential in acquitting many of the 491 defendants, suggesting the police had fabricated or inflated charges.

In March 1991, the police report suggested additional contributing internal police factors: squeezed overtime budgets which led to the initial deployment of 2,000 men, insufficient given the number of demonstrators, a lack of riot shields (400 "short" riot shields were available), and erratic or poor-quality radio, with a lag of up to five minutes in the computerised switching of radio messages during the evening West End rioting. Prime Minister Thatcher was at a conference of the Conservative Party Council in Cheltenham; the poll tax was the focus of the conference. As coverage of the demonstrations unfolded, speculation developed for the first time about Thatcher's position as leader.

Abolition of the tax
Vehement national opposition to the poll tax (which was especially strong in the north of England and Scotland) was the most important factor in its  abolition. An opinion poll conducted in 1990 indicated that 78% of those polled and who expressed an opinion gave preference to alternative means of taxation.

John Major, initially in his first Prime Minister's Questions, only said his government would "look at" the Community Charge, and if necessary "ensure it is accepted throughout the country", though it is a common misconception that he instantly scrapped it. In 1991, he then announced in a parliamentary speech as Prime Minister that the poll tax was to be replaced by Council Tax. The council tax came into effect in 1993. Similar to the previous system of rates, the new system set tax levels on property value. Although it was not directly linked to income, the council tax took ability to pay into consideration, unlike the poll tax.

See also

 
 1990 Strangeways Prison riot
 2011 United Kingdom anti-austerity protests
 Class conflict
 List of riots in London

References

Bibliography

Films

External links

On This Day, 31 March 1990, BBC archive
Gallery of photographs from 31 March riot
Role of The Militant in defeating the poll tax
The Rise of Militant  
Politicising the Poll Tax, Anarchist Workers Group
"The Poll Tax Revolt" documentary
Poll Tax Riot: The day that sunk Thatcher's flagship, The Socialist Worker
Anarchist Communist Federation: Anti-poll tax articles from Organise! (magazine), scanned articles about the anti–poll tax struggle (1988–1992) from Issues 14 to 27 inclusive

1990s in the City of Westminster
1990s crimes in London
1990 crimes in the United Kingdom
1990 in London
1990 riots
Civil disobedience
March 1990 crimes
March 1990 events in the United Kingdom
Protests in the United Kingdom
Riots in London
Riots and civil disorder in England
Poll taxes